Ernest Warriner Williamson (September 9, 1922 – March 6, 2002) was an American football player and coach. He play professional as a tackle in the National Football League (NFL) for the Washington Redskins and New York Giants and in the All-America Football Conference (AAFC) for the Los Angeles Dons. Williamson played college football at the University of North Carolina. He served as the head football coach at Sewanee: The University of the South in Sewanee, Tennessee from 1954 to 1956, compiling a record of 2–22–1.

Early life and college career
Williamson was born in Crewe, Virginia and attended Crewe High School. After graduating high school, he enlisted in the United States Navy and became a member of the Great Lakes Navy Bluejackets football team and he played for coach Paul Brown. He served in the South Pacific during World War II.

After attending The Apprentice School in Newport News, Virginia, Williamson attended and played college football at the University of North Carolina (UNC) in 1946. The 1946 North Carolina Tar Heels football team won the Southern Conference title and lost to Georgia in the Sugar Bowl. Williamson received an undergraduate degree in 1951 and a master's degree from UNC in 1952, both in physical education.

Professional career
Williamson was drafted in the tenth round of the 1947 NFL Draft by the Washington Redskins. He then played for the New York Giants and the Los Angeles Dons of the All-America Football Conference (AAFC), before a knee-injury ended his playing career.

Coaching and administrative career
In 1952, Williamson was hired as line coach for the football team and head coach for the track team at Sewanee: The University of the South in Sewanee, Tennessee. He served as an assistant football coach for two seasons before succeeding William C. White as head coach of the Sewanee Tigers football in 1954.

In 1957, Williamson returned to the University of North Carolina to head the Educational Foundation, a foundation that raises money for scholarships for student-athletes, which he led for three decades. Williamson received the William R. Davie Award from the UNC Board of Trustees in 1986 to recognize his distinguished service to the University. He also was the recipient of a Priceless Gem from the Department of Athletics in 1982 and a Distinguished Alumnus Award in 1997.

Death
Williamson died on March 6, 2002, in Chapel Hill, North Carolina, after suffering a stroke.

Head coaching record

College football

References

External links
 

1922 births
2002 deaths
American football tackles
Great Lakes Navy Bluejackets football players
Los Angeles Dons players
New York Giants players
North Carolina Tar Heels football players
Sewanee Tigers football coaches
Washington Redskins players
College track and field coaches in the United States
College wrestling coaches in the United States
United States Navy personnel of World War II
People from Crewe, Virginia
Coaches of American football from Virginia
Players of American football from Virginia